Unollocsina (possibly from Quechua unu, yaku water, lluqsina exit, "water exit") is a mountain in the Vilcanota mountain range in the Andes of Peru, about  high. It is located in the Cusco Region, Canchis Province, Checacupe District, and in the Puno Region, Carabaya Province, Corani District. Unollocsina lies north of the  glaciated area of Quelccaya (Quechua for "snow plain"), east of Millo.

References

Mountains of Cusco Region
Mountains of Puno Region
Mountains of Peru
Glaciers of Peru